The Independent Labor Group was a minor Australian political grouping in the New South Wales Legislative Council from 1959 to 1977. The group emerged when a number of Labor Party MLCs were expelled from the party for voting against the abolition of the Legislative Council, which was then party policy.

Eight Labor MLCs were expelled in 1959, and they were formally constituted as the Independent Labor Group on 22 August 1961, electing Thomas Gleeson as their leader. They held the balance of power throughout most of the early 1960s, increasing their numbers to ten in 1961, when the Coalition aided the election of Amelia Rygate. In the late 1960s, however, the group's power began to diminish. Amelia Rygate rejoined the Labor Party in 1966; Anne Press joined the Liberal Party in 1967. The last Independent Labor representative, Cyril Cahill, died in 1977.

Parliamentarians

References

Defunct political parties in New South Wales
Labour parties
Political parties established in 1959
1959 establishments in Australia
Political parties disestablished in 1977
1977 disestablishments in Australia